Mark Vryenhoek (9 January 1960) was an alpine skier from New Zealand. In the 1980 Winter Olympics at Lake Placid he did not finish in the Slalom and Giant Slalom.

References

External links  
 
 

1960 births
2016 deaths
New Zealand male alpine skiers
Olympic alpine skiers of New Zealand
Alpine skiers at the 1980 Winter Olympics